George Petrie may refer to:

 George Petrie (artist) (1790–1866), Irish antiquarian, archaeologist and artist
 George Petrie (politician) (1793–1879), U.S. Representative from New York
 George Petrie (American football) (1866–1947), American educator and football coach
 George O. Petrie (1912–1997), American actor